Manhattan Night of Murder is a 1965 German thriller film directed by Harald Philipp and starring George Nader, Heinz Weiss and Monika Grimm. It was the second of the Jerry Cotton series of films, depicting the adventures of an FBI agent.

Plot
A gang of extortionists murder owners of small businesses in case the refuse to pay for protection. After they have killed one of their victims Jerry Cotton hunts gets assigned to take care of this matter.

Cast
 George Nader as Jerry Cotton
 Heinz Weiss as Phil Decker
 Richard Münch as Mr. High
 Monika Grimm as Sally
 Slobodan Dimitrijevic as Alec Korsky
 Silvia Solar as Wilma de Loy
 Peter Kuiper as Bob
 Siegurd Fitzek as Patrick
 Allen Pinson as Jenkins
 Elke Neidhardt as Sophie Latimore
 Henri Cogan as Bruce
 Willy Semmelrogge as Doc
 Paul Muller as Dewey
 Uwe Reichmeister as Billy

Bibliography

References

External links

1965 films
1960s crime thriller films
German crime thriller films
German sequel films
West German films
1960s German-language films
Films directed by Harald Philipp
Films set in the United States
German black-and-white films
Films based on crime novels
Films based on German novels
Constantin Film films
1960s German films